Pipe dream may refer to:

Music 
 Pipe Dream (John Williamson album), 1997, or the titular song
 Pipedream (Alan Hull album), 1973
 Pipe Dreams (Murray Head album), 1995
 "Pipe Dreams" (Nelly Furtado song), 2016
 Pipe Dreams (Potluck album), 2009
 Pipe Dreams (Whirr album), 2012
 Pipedreams, a radio music program from American Public Media featuring the pipe organ, 1982-present day
 "Pipe Dream", a single by The Blues Magoos from their album Electric Comic Book, 1967
 "Pipe Dream", a song by Jeff Watson from his album Lone Ranger, 1992
 "Pipe Dream", a song by Project 86 from the album Project 86, 1998
 Pipe Dreams, an album by Mark Salling, 1982
 "Pipe Dreams", a song by Travis, from the album The Invisible Band, 2001
 Pipedreams, an album by Davy Spillane, 1991
 "Pipe-Dream", a song by King Gizzard & the Lizard Wizard from Oddments, 2014

Other media
 Pipe Dream (video game), a puzzle game made by Lucasfillm Arts
 Pipe Dream (film), a 2002 romantic comedy
 Pipe Dream (musical), a 1955 Rodgers and Hammerstein musical
 Pipe Dream (newspaper), a student newspaper at Binghamton University in New York
 Pipe Dreams (1916 film), starring Oliver Hardy
 Pipe Dreams (1976 film), starring Gladys Knight
 Operation Pipe Dreams, the code-name for a U.S. nationwide investigation in targeting businesses selling drug paraphernalia
 Pipe Dreams: Greed, Ego, and the Death of Enron, a 2002 book by Robert Bryce
 Pipe Dream, a 1989 video game originally called Pipe Mania
 Pipe Dream, a 2001 animation made by Animusic
 Pipe Dream, a 1959 short story by Fritz Leiber
 "Pipe Dreams", an episode of Rocko's Modern Life (season 2, episode 2)
 "Neil Josten", a character from the series All For The Game by Nora Sakavic (Book: The King's Men), 2014

Other 
 PipeDream, a built-in applications package for the Sinclair Cambridge Z88 ultra portable handheld computer
 Pipedream, a track that appears on the game SSX Tricky in the SSX franchise
 Pipedream (toolkit), a hacking toolkit targeting programmable logic controllers
 Wild dreams induced by inhaling from an opium pipe